Mangole is a dialect of the Sula language that is primarily spoken on Mangole Island in Indonesia.

References

Central Maluku languages
Languages of the Maluku Islands